Vincent John Martin (born 3 July 1960), known professionally as Vince Clarke, is an English synth-pop musician and songwriter. Clarke has been the main composer and musician of the band Erasure since its inception in 1985, and was previously the main songwriter of several groups, including Depeche Mode, Yazoo, and the Assembly. In Erasure he is known for his deadpan and low-key onstage demeanour, often remaining motionless over his keyboard, in sharp contrast to lead vocalist Andy Bell's animated and hyperactive frontman antics. 

Erasure have recorded over 200 songs and have sold over 28 million albums worldwide. Vince Clarke was inducted into the Rock and Roll Hall of Fame in 2020 as a member of Depeche Mode.

Early life
Vincent John Martin was born on 3 July 1960 in South Woodford, Essex; he later moved to Basildon, Essex. He initially studied the violin and then the piano, but he was inspired to make electronic music upon hearing Wirral synth band Orchestral Manoeuvres in the Dark (OMD). Along with OMD, other early influences included the Human League, Daniel Miller, and Fad Gadget.

Career

Early bands
In the late 1970s, Clarke and schoolmate Andy Fletcher formed a short-lived band called No Romance in China, with Clarke on vocals and guitar and Fletcher on bass guitar. In 1979, Clarke played guitar in an Ultravox-influenced band, the Plan, with friends Robert Marlow and Paul Langwith.

Depeche Mode

In 1980, after the Plan dissolved, Clarke and Fletcher formed Composition of Sound, and were soon joined by Martin Gore. Clarke provided vocals until lead vocalist Dave Gahan joined the band, which was renamed Depeche Mode. At that time he adopted the stage name Vince Clarke, by which he is currently known. The band initially adopted a slick synthesised electropop sound, which produced the studio album Speak & Spell and the Clarke-penned singles "Dreaming of Me", "New Life", and "Just Can't Get Enough" in 1981.

Clarke left Depeche Mode shortly thereafter. There were many rumoured reasons for his departure. He commented on Depeche Mode's later material as being a little dark for his taste, but good nonetheless. Clarke also stated that he did not enjoy the public aspects of success, such as touring and interviews, and found himself frequently at odds with his bandmates, particularly on the tour bus. He also stated: "I think everybody in the band, especially myself, imagined that the reason we were doing so well was because of themselves ... We were pretty young and very lucky, and things had happened very quickly for us, and I don't think we were really mature to handle the situation." Clarke was replaced by musician Alan Wilder, and Depeche Mode went on to achieve international stardom.

Yazoo

Clarke then teamed up with lead vocalist Alison Moyet (at the time known by the nickname of "Alf") to form the popular synth-pop duo Yazoo (known as Yaz in the U.S.), which produced two studio albums and a string of hits including "Only You," "Don't Go," "Situation," "The Other Side of Love," "Nobody's Diary," and "Walk Away from Love."

Yazoo disbanded in 1983, and Moyet went on to have a successful solo career. Yazoo reformed in 2008 for a series of live dates to celebrate 25 years since the duo's split.

The Assembly

Clarke teamed up with Eric Radcliffe in 1983. Their idea was to collaborate with different artists on each new single, under the name the Assembly. With singer Feargal Sharkey, former lead vocalist of the Undertones, they scored the top 5 UK hit "Never Never". Meanwhile, Clarke founded the label Reset Records with Radcliffe. During 1983 and 1984 he produced four singles, "The Face of Dorian Gray", "I Just Want to Dance", "Claudette", and "Calling All Destroyers" for his friend Robert Marlow, which were released on this label. They also produced a studio album, at first shelved but later released in 1999, under the name The Peter Pan Effect. In 1985, another collaboration took place with Paul Quinn of Bourgie Bourgie; the result was the single "One Day" by Vince Clarke & Paul Quinn. However, the project never took off, and Clarke moved on to other projects.

Erasure

In early 1985, Clarke placed an advertisement in Melody Maker for a singer, and one applicant was Andy Bell, who was a fan of his earlier projects. He teamed with Bell to form the group Erasure, and the duo became one of the major selling acts in British music with international hits like "Oh L'amour", "Sometimes", "Chains of Love", "A Little Respect", "Drama!", "Blue Savannah", "Chorus", "Love to Hate You", "Take a Chance on Me", and "Always".

As of November 2022, the duo have released 19 studio albums and have enjoyed a long string of hit singles spanning their four decades together.

VCMG 

In 2011, Clarke collaborated with his former Depeche Mode colleague Martin Gore for the first time since 1981, as techno duo VCMG, on an instrumental minimalist electronic dance album called Ssss, released on 12 March 2012. The first EP, entitled Spock, was released worldwide exclusively on Beatport on 30 November 2011. The second EP, Single Blip, was once again first released exclusively on Beatport on 20 February 2012. Their third EP, Aftermaths, was released on 20 August 2012.

Collaborations and other works
In July 1984, Clarke teamed up with Stephen Luscombe of Blancmange, Pandit Dinesh, and Asha Bhosle. The group, West India Company, released a four-track, self-titled EP.

Clarke worked with synth-pop producer Martyn Ware (of Heaven 17 and The Human League) in 1999 as The Clarke & Ware Experiment and released the album Pretentious. The duo collaborated again in 2001 for the album Spectrum Pursuit Vehicle, which was created with "3D music technology" specifically designed for listening in headphones. That same year also saw the release of the Clarke-produced album Erasure's Vince Clarke, which featured The Peter Pan Effect, an album that he and Eric Radcliffe produced for his long-time friend Robert Marlow. Clarke wrote "Let's Get Together" for the pop girl group Girl Authority for their second and final studio album, Road Trip (2007). The song was originally meant to be for Depeche Mode but was never recorded by them. Clarke also co-wrote "What Do I Want from You?" with Freeform Five, for their debut studio album Strangest Things (2005).

Also in 2001, Clarke founded Illustrious Co. Ltd. with Martyn Ware, to create new forms of spatialised sound composition using their unique 3D AudioScape system, collaborating with fine artists, educational establishments, the performing arts, live events, corporate clients, and educational settings round the world.

In 2004, Clarke provided additional music for an episode of Johnny Bravo entitled "The Time of My Life". This was a collaboration with Richard Butler of the Psychedelic Furs.

Clarke was an essential component of a 2000 project called Family Fantastic. They produced the album Nice!. In 2008 Family Fantastic released a second album, entitled Wonderful.

On 21 May 2009, Clarke was awarded with an "Outstanding Song Collection" prize, during the Ivor Novello Awards ceremony of the same day, in recognition of 30 years in the music industry.

Clarke was featured in the BBC Four documentary Synth Britannia (2009).

In 2012, Clarke collaborated with the band the Good Natured on a track called "Ghost Train", available as a free download on their website, in exchange for a Tweet.

Also in 2012, Clarke produced a cover of the Depeche Mode song "Fly on the Windscreen" featuring Ane Brun.

Clarke also did DJ sets in various locations in North America and Europe and also continued his production work of remixing songs for Dido and Chad Valley. 

In October 2013, Clarke announced on his Twitter page that he was providing assistance to musicians BT and Christian Burns for their All Hail the Silence project.

On 14 July 2015, Clarke announced a collaboration with Jean-Michel Jarre called "Automatic", which was released as a part of the full album Electronica 1: The Time Machine on 16 October 2015.

On 10 June 2016, in collaboration with Paul Hartnoll, Clarke digitally released the album 2 Square on his new record label, VeryRecords.

Since 2017, Clarke has hosted The Synthesizer Show with VeryRecords artist Reed Hays on Maker Park Radio, a non-profit community streaming radio station from Staten Island, New York. The first episode aired 20 December 2017.

Influences

In December 2013, Clarke listed his "13 LPs that mean the most to him" for The Quietus:

 Pink Floyd – The Dark Side of the Moon (1973)
 Kraftwerk – Computer World (1981)
 The Human League – Travelogue (1980)
 Simon & Garfunkel – Bookends (1968)
 T. Rex – Electric Warrior (1971)
 David Bowie – "Heroes" (1977)
 The Eagles – Hotel California (1976)
 Orchestral Manoeuvres in the Dark – Orchestral Manoeuvres in the Dark (1980)
 Philip Glass – Glassworks (1982)
 Genesis – A Trick of the Tail (1976)
 Michael Jackson – Dangerous (1991)
 The Sex Pistols – Never Mind the Bollocks, Here's the Sex Pistols (1977)
 Led Zeppelin – Led Zeppelin IV (1971)

Production and recording methods
When Clarke started making music, synthesisers were predominantly analogue; digital synthesizers were rare and would remain so until the launch of the Yamaha DX7 in 1983. In order to connect analogue synthesisers, analogue drum machines and analogue sequencers together, multiple CV/gate cables were required between each device. This system was not standardised, so inter-operability between instruments from different manufacturers was not always straightforward. In addition, some manufacturers used their own proprietary interfaces. When an industry-wide standard called MIDI (Musical Instrument Digital Interface) was introduced in 1983, Clarke, like most other electronic musicians, gradually migrated to the new technology. However, he continued to prefer his older analogue instruments:

"... CV and Gate is tighter. I can hear and feel that it's tighter than MIDI – we can even prove it using 'scopes. Because everything is clocked simply, it arrives bang on the beat. The whole production starts to 'tick over'. Just look at Kraftwerk's stuff. I think that 'feel' has been lost with MIDI sequencers. No matter what you do with MIDI, the music will never sound as good as it did in the good old Futurist days. That's why our tracks sound the way they do."

For Erasure's fifth studio album Chorus (1991), he gathered together his collection of analogue synthesisers from various recording studio locations in London and set up a small studio in Amsterdam. This led Clarke to assemble an intricate patch system to more easily enable the control of his analogue instruments:

"... the secret is having a good patch system – not as in patching to the mixing desk, but in patching CV and Gate. Because we don't use MIDI at all, you have to run three or four cables between each synth module – CV, Gate, Filter, Amplitude or whatever – and you've got to have a really unique system to do that.""

In 1993 Clarke described his approach to songwriting:

"Andy [Bell] and I get together with a guitar and a tape recorder, I'll strum some chords, he'll sing a melody, and we work in little sections, four or eight bars long. Then we'll try stringing the sections together. It's like a jigsaw puzzle. I find it very hard to relate songwriting to synthesisers, actually – we write songs in a very traditional way. The electronic side of things is just to create the atmosphere. It's mostly just messing about..! Once we've worked out a song, I start programming up the arrangement on the BBC UMI sequencer, which lets me run 16 synths simultaneously. That way you get a better idea if parts are working together or not. Then we start refining the individual sounds. And finally the whole lot is transferred to my Roland MC4, piece by piece, so it's being run in CV and Gate. Once we've got that, it's a case of Andy sketching out vocal ideas – in the studio we use two 48 track digital tape machines, which gives Dinger 24 tracks just for his voice!" "

Clarke continued to expand his collection of analogue synthesisers and in 1994 set up "37B", a recording studio built adjacent to his custom-made home, "Ammonite", in Chertsey, Surrey. From 1994 to 2003, all Erasure studio albums were either wholly or in part recorded at "37B".

In 2004 Clarke moved to Maine. While waiting for his studio equipment to be shipped from the UK he began using an Apple Mac laptop with Logic Pro, Max/MSP, and various software synthesisers (many of which were analogue emulations). Since then he has continued to use Logic Pro, along with both software and analogue synthesisers:

"Nowadays, you can take the best bits from digital and analogue. On certain projects – say, if I'm doing library music – where you need to have instant recall all the time, then it's obviously much more convenient to use the computer. When it comes to writing a new song, though, I still like to have the old analogue gear there, too. But, a lot of soft synths have a character of their own, too; the Moog Modular V is just crazy! I think that analogue has an inherent sound to it – it's like the old argument over vinyl versus CD. It seems that you hear more frequencies coming from an analogue synth than you do from a software synth, but the great thing about the latter is that you can do far more complex modulation, both within the synth itself and on the keyboard. To emulate any of those really complex modulations on an analogue ... well, you'd need a mile of cable." "

As of 2009, Clarke has installed his analogue synthesisers alongside his Logic Pro-based workstation in a custom-built commercial studio called "The Cabin" in Maine.

Current & past studio equipment: Dave Smith Instruments Mopho, Roland System 700, Roland System-100M, Roland Jupiter-8, Roland Jupiter-4, Roland MKS-80, Roland SH-1, Roland VP-330, Roland JP-8000, Roland Juno-60, Roland Juno-106, Roland Super JX, Roland D-550, ARP 2500 Modular, ARP 2600, PPG Wave 2.2, Waldorf Microwave, Waldorf Pulse, Moog Modular, Minimoog, Moog Source, E-Mu Modular System, Buchla 100 series Modular, Sequential Circuits Prophet-5, Sequential Circuits Pro-One, Oxford Synthesiser Company OSCar, Synton Syrinx, Korg MS-20, Korg MS-10, Korg 700, Korg M1, Korg DVP, Serge Modular, Polyfusion Modular, Oberheim Xpander, Oberheim SEM System, RSF Kobol, Electronic Music Studios VCS 3, Matten and Wiechers x2 48 track sequencers total 96 track, Sennheiser Vocoder VSM201, Apple iPad 2, Apple Power Mac G5, Apple MacBook Pro.

Current & past software:  Apple Logic Pro, Cycling '74 Max/MSP, Arturia ARP 2600 V, Arturia Minimoog V, Arturia Moog Modular V, GForce impOSCar, GForce Oddity, LinPlug Octopus, Muon Tau Pro, Native Instruments Absynth, Native Instruments Reaktor, Native Instruments FM7, Native Instruments FM8, Vienna Symphonic String & Choir Libraries.

Personal life
Clarke has been married to Tracy Hurley since 2004. They have a son named Oscar and live in Brooklyn, New York City, with another home in Maine. Tracy Hurley is co-founder of the Morbid Anatomy Museum (now closed) in Brooklyn. Her twin sister, the American author Tonya Hurley, is married to Michael Pagnotta, the former manager of Erasure.

Discography
with Depeche Mode
Speak & Spell (1981, studio album)
"Dreaming of Me" (1981, single)
"New Life" (1981, single)
"Just Can't Get Enough" (1981, single)
The Singles 81→85 (1985, compilation album – only the tracks noted above as singles plus the bonus tracks on the 1998 reissue: "Just Can't Get Enough" (Schizo Mix) and "Photographic" (Some Bizzare version))
Catching Up with Depeche Mode (1985, compilation album – only the tracks noted above as singles)
Some Great Videos (1985, video album – only "Just Can't Get Enough" clip)
Remixes 81–04 (2004, compilation album – only tracks "Shout!" (Rio Remix) and "Just Can't Get Enough" (Schizo Mix))
The Best of Depeche Mode Volume 1 (2006, compilation album – only "Just Can't Get Enough" track)
The Best of Videos Volume 1 (2006, video album – only "Just Can't Get Enough" clip)
Remixes 2: 81–11 (2011, compilation album – only "Puppets" (Röyksopp Remix) track)
Video Singles Collection (2016, video album – only "Just Can't Get Enough" clip)

with Yazoo
Upstairs at Eric's (1982, studio album)
"Only You" (1982, single)
"Don't Go" (1982, single)
"The Other Side of Love" (1982, single)
"Situation" (1982, single)
You and Me Both (1983, album)
"Nobody's Diary" (1983, single)

with the Assembly
"Never Never" (1983, single)
In collaboration with Paul Quinn
"One Day" (1985, single)

With Erasure
See Erasure discography

Solo
Lucky Bastard (1993, Sample CD)
Deeptronica (2009, studio album)

In collaboration with Martyn Ware
Pretentious (1999, as The Clarke and Ware Experiment)
Spectrum Pursuit Vehicle (2001, as Vincent Clarke & Martyn Ware)
The House of Illustrious (2012, as The Clarke and Ware Experiment)

with Family Fantastic
Nice! (2000)
Wonderful (2008)

In RadioActivators
"Knock on Your Door" (2001, single)

In VCMG
Ssss (2012, studio album)
"Spock" (2011, EP)
"Single Blip" (2012, EP)
"Aftermaths" (2012, EP)
In collaboration with Paul Hartnoll
2Square (2016, album)
"Better Have a Drink to Think" (2016, single)

Remixes
He has remixed the following songs for artists other than Erasure:
 1988 Happy Mondays – "WFL (Wrote for Luck)"
 1990 Betty Boo – "24 Hours" (Oratronic Mix)
 1991 Fortran 5 – "Heart on the Line" (V.C. Mix)
 1991 Habit – "Power"
 1992 Nitzer Ebb – "Ascend" (Anonymous Mix)
 1992 The Wolfgang Press – "Angel"
 1992 Betty Boo – "I'm On My Way" (The Batman And Robin Mix)
 1993 The Time Frequency – "Real Love '93" (Vince Clarke Remix)
 1994 Sparks – "When Do I Get to Sing 'My Way'" (Vince Clarke Remix & Vince Clarke Extended Remix)
 1994 Alison Moyet – "Whispering Your Name" (A Remix)
 1995 Egebamyasi – "Remont" (Vince Version)
 1995 Wubble-U – "Down – Get 'Em Down" (Vince Clarke Remix)
 1997 White Town – "Wanted" (Vince Clarke Mix)
 2001 Marlow – "My Teenage Dream" (Stealth Mix)
 2001 Marlow – "No Heart" (Vince Clarke 2001 Dance Mix)
 2002 Simple Minds – "Homosapien" (Vince Clarke Remix)
 2005 Andy Bell – "Crazy" (Vince Clarke Remix)
 2005 Rammstein – "Mann Gegen Mann" (Popular Music Mix)
 2006 Rosenstolz – "Nichts Von Alledem (Tut Mir Leid)" (Mixed Up Mix & Maxed Up Mix)
 2006 Noirhaus – "It's Over" (Vince Clarke Remix)
 2009 The Saturdays – "Issues" (Vince Clarke Extended & Vince Clarke Radio Edit)
 2009 Marlow – "Home" (Vince Clarke's Starstruck Mix)
 2009 Polly Scattergood – "Other Too Endless" (Vince Clarke Remix)
 2009 Franz Ferdinand – "No You Girls" (Vince Clarke Mix)
 2009 The Presets – "If I Know You" (Vince Clarke Remix)
 2009 Space Cowboy – "Falling Down" (Vince Clarke Remix)
 2009 A Place to Bury Strangers – "In Your Heart" (Vince Clarke Remix)
 2009 Ash – "True Love 1980" (Vince Clarke Remix)
 2010 Andy Bell – "Call On Me" (Vince Clarke Remix)
 2010 Andy Bell – "Non-Stop" (Vince Clarke Remix)
 2010 Goldfrapp – "Believer" (Vince Clarke Remix & Vince Clarke Remix Edit)
 2011 Billie Ray Martin – "Sweet Suburban Disco" (Vince Clarke Remix)
 2011 Depeche Mode – "Behind the Wheel" (Vince Clarke Remix)
 2011 Plastikman – "Elektrostatik" (Vince Clarke Remix)
 2011 The Present Moment – "Loyal to a Fault" (Analogue Edit)
 2012 Liars – "No.1 Against the Rush" (Vince Clarke Remix)
 2012 VCMG – "Aftermaths" (Vince Clarke Remix)
 2012 Kidnap Kid – "Lazarus Taxon" (Vince Clarke Remix)
 2013 Chad Valley – "Up & Down" (Vince Clarke Remix)
 2013 Dido – "End of Night" (Vince Clarke Remix)
 2013 Blancmange – "Living on the Ceiling" (Vince Clarke Remix)
 2014 Polly Scattergood – "Subsequently Lost" (Vince Clarke Remix)
 2014 Bleachers – "I Wanna Get Better" (Vince Clarke Remix)
 2014 Future Islands – "Doves" (Vince Clarke Remix)
 2015 Simon Lowery – "I am an Astronaut" (Vince Clarke Remix)
 2016 Nitzer Ebb – "Once You Say" (Vince Clarke Remix)
 2016 Andy Bell – "My Precious One" (Vince Clarke Remix)
 2016 Reed & Caroline – "Electrons" (Vince Clarke Remix)
 2017 Bright Light Bright Light – "Running Back to You" (Vince Clarke Remix)
 2017 Miss Kittin & Dubfire – "Ride" (Vince Clarke Remix)
 2017 The Overlords – "God's Eye" (Vince Clarke Loony Remix)
 2017 Alka – "Truncate" (Vince Clarke Remix)
 2018 Ladytron – "The Animals" (Vince Clarke Remix)
 2018 Robert Görl – "Part 1" (Vince Clarke Remix)
 2018 Lanah P – "Pistol in My Pocket" (Erasure 2018 Mix)
 2018 Reed & Caroline – "Before" (Vince Clarke Remix)
 2018 Soft Cell – "Bedsitter" (Erasure Remix)
 2018 Space – "Magic Fly" (Vince Clarke Rework)
 2018 Benjamin Lowery – "Imagine" (Vince Clarke Remix)
 2019 James Yorkston – "Shallow" (Vince Clarke Remix)
 2019 All Hail the Silence – "The Alarm" (Vince Clarke Remix)
 2019 Fujiya & Miyagi – "Fear of Missing Out" (Vince Clarke Remix)
 2019 Orchestral Manoeuvres in the Dark – "Almost" (Vince Clarke Remix)
 2020 International Teachers Of Pop – "Femenenergy" (Vince Clarke Remix)
 2020 Yova – "Rain" (Vince Clarke Remix)
 2020 Alka – "Faito" (Vince Clarke Remix)
 2021 Tiny Magnetic Pets – "Automation" (Vince Clarke Remix)
 2021 Saint Etienne – "Blue Kite" (Vince Clarke Remix)
 2021 Xqui – "Martha" (Vince Clarke Remix)
 2022 Johnny Marr – "Spirit Power & Soul" (Vince Clarke Remix)

References

External links

 
 
 
 Erasure Information Service, the official Erasure website
 Vince Clarke Feature by Cold War Night Life

1960 births
20th-century English musicians
21st-century English musicians
Depeche Mode members
English electronic musicians
English expatriates in the United States
English new wave musicians
English record producers
English songwriters
English DJs
Erasure members
Ivor Novello Award winners
Living people
Mute Records artists
People from Woodford, London
Musicians from Essex
Remixers
British synth-pop new wave musicians
Yazoo (band) members
People from Basildon
The Assembly members